The Global Ocean Race (GOR, previously known as Portimão Global Ocean Race) is a yachting race for Class40 yachts which was first held in 2008–09. The second edition took place in 2011–12 and the third edition was scheduled to start in September 2015.

The race was created for single- and doublehanded yachts (Category "Singlehand/Class 40" and “Doublehanded/Class 40") and small budgets. The two former professional yachtsmen Josh Hall and Brian Hancock were the initiators of the race. The GOR is the first Class-40-race leading through the Southern Ocean (Pacific) and around Cape Horn.

History

2008–09 race

The six yachts (two solo, four double-handed) started the first edition of the race on 12 October 12, 2008 in Portimão, Portugal. The finish was in June 2009. The race was divided into five legs: The first one lead from Portimão to Cape Town, the second to Wellington, New Zealand. Leg three ended in Ilhabela, Brazil. The race continued to Charleston, South Carolina, USA and from there back to Portimão. In all, the race covered a distance of about 30,000 nm.

Overall standings

Single-handed

Double-handed

2011–12 race
The second edition of the Global Ocean Race featured six double-handed Class40 yachts. It started in September 2011 from Palma, Majorca, Spain and ended in June 2012 in Les Sables-d'Olonne, France. The race was made up of 5 legs with stops in Cape Town, South Africa, Wellington, New Zealand, Punta del Este, Uruguay and Charleston, United States.

Overall standings
Source:

2015–16 race (Cancelled)
The third edition of the race has been announced to start in September 2015 and would again feature single- and double-handed categories. The race would start in Southampton, England and end in Portsmouth. There would be only one stop, in Auckland, New Zealand.

See also
 Vendée Globe
 Barcelona World Race
 Volvo Ocean Race

External links
 Official website

References

Recurring events established in 2008
Round-the-world sailing competitions
Yachting races